Rudolf Steiner School Kings Langley was a Steiner School located in Kings Langley, Hertfordshire, England, formed in 1949.

The school catered for pupils aged 3 to 19 years old.

In July 2017 the Department for Education (DfE) issued an order of de-registration of the school. This followed earlier concerns over child safeguarding resulting in a March 2017 instruction from the DfE to not admit new students.

An appeal of the de-registration order on behalf of the school failed, and the school closed on the 29th of March 2019.

History of the school
The grounds are on the site of the medieval Dominican Priory of Kings Langley. The school was incorporated in its present form offering Waldorf education in 1949 and was at that time called the New School. A private school had existed on this site since around 1909 and was known as Coombe Hill School or Priory School. The headmistress, Margaret Cross, was interested in progressive ideas in education and in 1921 attended a course run by Dr. Rudolf Steiner, who visited the school himself in April 1922. From then on elements of Steiner's educational method such as bio-dynamic gardening and eurythmy were included in the curriculum. The school became fully committed to the Steiner method in 1949. The main school block was built in stages between 1955 and 1975, the dining room and theatre added in 1969–71 and the sports hall in 1970. The kindergarten was built on the edge of the grounds near Friarswood in 1966 and the Pottery, was opened in 1991.

The three stages of Steiner education at the school

There are three stages to any Steiner education: kindergarten, lower school and upper school.

There were two Kindergartens at Rudolf Steiner Kings Langley School, both of which were in a separate area from the main school building. This was where children from 3 years of age to 5 years spent their day. Kindergarten was like an extended playgroup. During the day the children played games, did creative activities and went on short walks in the school grounds.

The lower school consisted of classes 1 to 8. There was one class per year with roughly 25 students in each class. The years were academically one year behind the average state school, for example children in class six would be in year seven at a state secondary school.

Writing and reading skills were developed during classes 1 and 2. French and German were also introduced at this time through songs and games. Creativity was still being developed in the children at this stage. They started handwork where they learnt to knit, perform a play during the course of the year, and work outside in the gardening lesson. Another subject they started is Eurythmy, which was a way of telling stories through body movement.

More solid subjects such as Mathematics, English Literature, History, Geography, Religion and the Sciences were introduced in the middle school from class 3 to 8. During this period no exams on these subjects took place.

The upper school was from class 9 to 13. The Steiner Schools GCSE examinations were started a year later than state schools to give the students in class 9 the opportunity to go on a French or German exchange for a term. This was recommended as it enhanced their understanding of the language. Therefore, GCSEs were taken in class 11 and A-levels were taken in class 13.

School Lessons 

The Waldorf curriculum offers many subjects which are not usually included in state schools. These subjects are main lesson, gardening, handwork, pottery, woodwork, metalwork, painting and drawing, sponsor lesson and Eurythmy.

Main Lesson is usually the first lesson of the day for all classes, up until class 12, which covers a number of different topics depending on which class you attend. A typical main lesson could last about 2–4 weeks.
Gardening is an outdoor lesson which introduces some agricultural education into the school's curriculum. This lesson is done from classes 3 to 6.
Handwork is part of the craft lessons, and teaches young students how to knit, crochet and varied forms of sowing. This lesson is introduced to classes 1 to 8.
Pottery is an art lesson where pupils can learn how to work with clay and design ceramic projects. The school has its own separate building for this subject which also houses a kiln. Pottery is introduced from class 4.
Woodwork and Metalwork are both lessons where pupils can develop their practical skills using hand and machine tools. Metal work contains more hazardous machines, so it is only introduced from class 9 onwards.
Painting and drawing are introduced to pupils from a young age. In the higher classes, more materials are introduced like acrylic and oil paints, charcoal and pastels.

Sponsors 

Sponsors are ordinary teachers who are assigned to supervise an upper school class from classes 9 to 13. There can be up to two sponsors per class. The sponsor lessons are only for the upper school and pupils discuss any issues or questions with their sponsor.

Safeguarding, inspections and DfE restriction of no new students
The school has had six inspections by the School Inspection Service and Ofsted from March 2015 to December 2016. The School Inspection Service report on the March 2015 inspection stated: "risk assessments, have not been adequately maintained
and updated". The School Inspection Service inspectors wrote in November 2015: "The school has not investigated either fully or impartially important matters that were raised by parents nor considered them in the broader context of risk to children."   A year later (November 2016), there was an Ofsted inspection, which stated:  "They (pupils) say that they are safe – but they are not, because of flaws in the school’s systems and procedures for safeguarding and child protection."  In December 2016, Ofsted carried out another inspection and the report rated the school as inadequate against 4 criteria and requiring improvement against the remaining two.  The report stated: "The arrangements for safeguarding are not effective".

In a letter of 9 March 2017, the Secretary of State for Education imposed a restriction: "to cease to admit any new student to the school".

References

External links 
Coombe Hill School, later Priory School, Kings Langley

Educational institutions established in 1949
Defunct schools in Hertfordshire
Waldorf schools in the United Kingdom
Dacorum
1949 establishments in England
Educational institutions disestablished in 2019
2019 disestablishments in England